Nadya Mason is the Rosalyn Sussman Yalow Professor of Physics at the University of Illinois at Urbana-Champaign. As a condensed matter experimentalist, she works on the quantum limits of low-dimensional systems. Mason is the Director of the Illinois Materials Research Science and Engineering Center (I-MRSEC) and, since September 2022, the Director of the Beckman Institute for Advanced Science and Technology. She is the first woman and woman of color to work as the director at the institute.  In 2021, she was elected to the National Academy of Sciences.

Personal life 
Mason was born in New York City, and lived in Brooklyn for the first six years of her life. She grew up in Washington, D.C. before moving to Houston. In 1986 she trained as a gymnast with Bela Karolyi and competed as a member of the U.S. National Team. She currently lives in Urbana, IL, where she is a faculty member at the University of Illinois, Urbana-Champaign. She has two daughters.

Education 
Mason always enjoyed math and science, and completed several science-focused internships during her education, including a fellowship in condensed matter at Bell Laboratories. She completed a bachelor's degree at Harvard University in 1995. In 2001 she earned a PhD under Aharon Kapitulnik at Stanford University.

Research 
Mason returned to Harvard as a MRSEC Postdoctoral Fellow in 2001, where she was elected junior fellow in the Harvard Society of Fellows. In 2005, Mason joined the University of Illinois at Urbana–Champaign. Her research focuses on carbon nanotubes, graphene, nanostructured semiconductors and topological insulators. In these systems she concentrates on electron interactions, and how to apply her understanding to quantum computing. She has discussed the limit on the size of electronics and impact of novel nanomaterials for the University of Illinois at Urbana–Champaign YouTube channel.

In 2006 she demonstrated the non-equilibrium Kondo effect and in 2011 observed individual superconducting bound states in graphene-based systems. In 2014 Mason was appointed a John Bardeen Faculty Scholar in Physics at University of Illinois at Urbana–Champaign. In 2016 she was appointed to full Professor.

Service and outreach 
Nadya Mason is a General Councillor for the American Physical Society. She is Chair of the APS Committee on Minorities and was featured by the National Society of Black Physicists for Black History Month in 2017.

In November 2019, Mason gave a TED talk called, "How to spark your creativity, scientifically."

Honors and awards 
2021 - Elected to the American Academy of Arts and Sciences and to the US National Academy of Sciences
2020 - Edward Bouchet Award, American Physical Society
2018 - Fellow, American Physical Society
2013 - Dean's Award for Excellence in Research, University of Illinois at Urbana–Champaign
2012 - Maria Goeppert Mayer Award, American Physical Society
2009 - Denice Denton Emerging Leader Award Anita Borg Institute Women of Vision Awards
2008 - Woodrow Wilson Career Enhancement Fellow 
2008 - Diverse Magazine "Emerging Scholar" 
2007 - National Science Foundation CAREER award

References 

Living people
American women physicists
Women materials scientists and engineers
Superconductivity scientists and engineers
Harvard University alumni
Stanford University alumni
U.S. women's national team gymnasts
Year of birth missing (living people)
University of Illinois Urbana-Champaign faculty
Fellows of the American Academy of Arts and Sciences
Members of the United States National Academy of Sciences
21st-century American women
Fellows of the American Physical Society